Daniel James Hatfield Finch-Hatton, 17th Earl of Winchilsea, 12th Earl of Nottingham (born 7 October 1967), is a British hereditary peer and descendant of the American Vanderbilt family and the Hungarian Széchenyi family.

He was a member of the House of Lords between June and November 1999.

Early life
He was born to Christopher Finch-Hatton, 16th Earl of Winchilsea, 11th Earl of Nottingham (1936–1999) and his wife, Shirley Hatfield (d. 22 October 2017). His paternal grandparents were Christopher Finch-Hatton, 15th Earl of Winchilsea (1911–1950) and Countess Gladys Széchényi Sárvár-Felsövidék. Finch-Hatton's paternal great-grandparents were Guy Finch-Hatton, 14th Earl of Winchilsea (1885–1939) and Margaretta Armstrong Drexel (1885–1952), the daughter of banker Anthony Joseph Drexel Jr. of Philadelphia. Finch-Hatton's other great-grandparents were Count László Széchényi Sárvár-Felsövidék (1879–1938) and Gladys Moore Vanderbilt (1886–1965).

Together, his parents had:
Daniel Finch-Hatton, 17th Earl of Winchilsea
Lady Alice Nan Christine Finch-Hatton (born 1970)

Peerage
When his father died on 26 June 1999, he inherited his titles, including the seat in the House of Lords. However, he lost this seat on 11 November 1999, when the House of Lords Act was implemented. There are no speeches listed for him in Hansard.

Activities
Daniel Finch-Hatton appears in adverts for Hattons of London, a private collectable coin merchant, where he holds the title of Honorary Chairman.

Personal life
He married Shelley Amanda Gillard in 1994, with whom he has children:
Tobias Joshua Stormont Finch-Hatton, Viscount Maidstone (born 21 June 1998)
Sebastian Alexander Heneage Finch-Hatton (born 6 June 2002)
India Olivia Scarlett Finch-Hatton (born 5 November 2004)

References

External links 
 Persondata at thepeerage.com
 
 Daniel Finch-Hatton, 17th Earl of Winchilsea

17
712
20th-century British people
21st-century British people
1967 births
Daniel Finch-Hatton
Daniel
Living people
Daniel Finch-Hatton
Daniel Finch-Hatton
British people of American descent
British people of Dutch descent
British people of Hungarian descent

Winchilsea